Maksim Yuryevich Grigoryev (born 13 October 1983) is a former Russian professional football player.

Club career
He played 4 seasons in the Russian Football National League for FC Neftekhimik Nizhnekamsk,  FC Sokol Saratov and FC Baltika Kaliningrad.

References

External links
 

1983 births
People from Engels, Saratov Oblast
Living people
Russian footballers
Association football midfielders
FC Neftekhimik Nizhnekamsk players
FC Sokol Saratov players
FC Spartak Tambov players
FC Baltika Kaliningrad players
FC Sheksna Cherepovets players
FC Oryol players
Latvian Higher League players
Russian expatriate footballers
Expatriate footballers in Latvia
Russian expatriate sportspeople in Latvia
FC Spartak-2 Moscow players
Sportspeople from Saratov Oblast